Nilay Konar (born August 30, 1980 in Ankara) is a Turkish volleyball player. She is 191 cm and plays as middle blocker. She plays for Galatasaray Medical Park.

Career
 Aroma Women's Volleyball League 
 Winner : 2006, 2007.

Clubs

Awards

Club
 2011-12 Turkish Cup -  Runner-up, with Galatasaray Daikin
 2011-12 CEV Cup -  Runner-up, with Galatasaray Daikin
 2012 Turkish Volleyball Super Cup -  Runner-Up, with Galatasaray Daikin
 2012-2013 Turkish Women's Volleyball Cup -  Bronze Medal with Galatasaray Daikin

See also
 Turkish women in sports

References

1980 births
Living people
Turkish women's volleyball players
Eczacıbaşı volleyball players
Galatasaray S.K. (women's volleyball) players
Sportspeople from Ankara
20th-century Turkish sportswomen
21st-century Turkish sportswomen